Mad Town is the debut extended play by South Korean boy band Madtown. It was released digitally on October 6, 2014, and physically on October 9, 2014. The song "YOLO" was used to promote the EP.

Music video
Prior to the release of the full music video, J. Tune Camp uploaded the music video teaser for "YOLO" on its official YouTube channel on October 1, 2014. The full music video was subsequently released 5 days later on October 6, 2014.

Track listing

Charts

Sales and certifications

Release history

References

2014 debut EPs
K-pop EPs
Kakao M EPs